Spend the Night is the 25th studio album released by The Isley Brothers on Warner Bros. Records on October 5, 1989. The last official record featuring original members Rudolph and Ronald recording together, Rudolph officially left the group after recording this album which explains why Ronald is the only Isley Brothers member on the cover.

Reception

Essentially considered a Ronald Isley solo album and co-conceived by his manager and then-girlfriend Angela Winbush, the album also included a guest rap by Kool Moe Dee on the song "Come Together" and spawned three top 30 R&B chart hits.

Track listing

Personnel
The Isley Brothers
Ronald Isley – lead & background vocals
Rudolph Isley – lead & background vocals

with
Tony Maiden – lead guitar (tracks 2, 3, 5-7)
Angela Winbush – synthesizer (tracks 2, 3, 7), keyboards (tracks 1-5, 7), bass synthesizer (tracks 1, 7), drum machine programming (tracks 1-7), flute solo (track 1), additional background vocals (tracks 1, 3, 5-7)
Jeff Lorber – additional synthesizers (tracks 2, 3, 7)
Nathan East – bass (tracks 1-5, 7)
Rayford Griffin – synth drums & toms (track 5)
John Robinson – drums (tracks 2, 7)
Kool Moe Dee – rap guest on "Come Together"

Technical personnel & arrangements
Produced by Ronald Isley, Rudolph Isley & Angela Winbush
Arranged by Angela Winbush
String arrangements by Gene Page
Recorded & mixed by Jeff Lorenzen
Strings recorded by Mike Mancini
Additional engineer: Mitch Gibson
Assistant engineers: Darren Prindle, Dennis Stefani, Jim Champagne, Mark Hagen
Mastered by Brian Gardner
Art direction by Janet Levinson
Design by Johnny Lee
Photography by Jeff Katz

References

External links
 The Isley Brothers - Spend the Night (1989) album releases & credits at Discogs
 The Isley Brothers - Spend the Night (1989) album to be listened as stream on Spotify

1989 albums
The Isley Brothers albums
Albums arranged by Gene Page
Albums produced by Angela Winbush
Warner Records albums